Baghlia (Arabic بغلية) is a town and commune in the Baghlia District of Boumerdès Province, Algeria. According to the 1998 census it has a population of 15,854.

During the colonial period, it was given the name of Rébeval, after Napoleonic general Joseph Boyer de Rébeval.

History

French conquest

 Expedition of the Col des Beni Aïcha (1837)
 First Battle of the Issers (1837)
 Battle of the Col des Beni Aïcha (1871)

Algerian Revolution

Salafist terrorism

 August 2010 Baghlia bombing (18 August 2010)
 2012 Baghlia bombing (29 April 2012)

Notable people

 Lounés Bendahmane, footballer

References

Communes of Boumerdès Province
Boumerdès Province